Jonquière—Alma was a federal electoral district in Quebec, Canada, that has been represented in the House of Commons of Canada from 2004 to 2011.

It was created in 2003 from parts of Jonquière and Lac-Saint-Jean—Saguenay ridings.

It consists of:
the borough of Jonquière in the City of Saguenay,
the City of Alma in the Regional County Municipality of Lac-Saint-Jean-Est, and
the municipalities of Bégin, Larouche, Saint-Ambroise, Saint-Charles-de-Bourget and Saint-David-de-Falardeau in the Regional County Municipality of Le Fjord-du-Saguenay.

The neighbouring ridings are Roberval—Lac-Saint-Jean and Chicoutimi—Le Fjord.

This riding is distinctive for having the lowest Liberal vote percentage in the country in the 2006 election, at only 3.1.

This riding was dissolved into Jonquière and Lac-Saint-Jean during the 2012 electoral redistribution.

Members of Parliament

This riding has elected the following Members of Parliament:

Election results

See also
 List of Canadian federal electoral districts
 Past Canadian electoral districts

References

Campaign expense data from Elections Canada

Riding history from the Library of Parliament

Notes

Alma, Quebec
Former federal electoral districts of Quebec
Politics of Saguenay, Quebec